This article is outdated, please fix it here

Visitors to South Sudan must obtain an electronic visa unless they are of a South Sudanese origin, come from one of the visa exempt countries or they come from one of the countries whose citizens are eligible for visa on arrival.

Visa policy map

Visa exemption
Citizens of the following 4 countries do not require a visa to visit South Sudan:

Visa on arrival
The following contents have not been confirmed.

Citizens of the following countries are eligible to obtain a visa on arrival costing between US$50 and 100:

Visa on arrival is also granted to holders of an identity card copy issued by the United Nations with a clearance from the Ministry of Foreign Affairs in South Sudan

Holders of diplomatic, official, service and special passports issued to nationals of any country can obtain a visa on arrival.

Future
In September 2020 South Sudan announced that all citizens of non-exempt countries, would be eligible to apply for electronic visas for visiting South Sudan.

See also

Visa requirements for South Sudanese citizens
Tourism in South Sudan

References

South Sudan
Tourism in South Sudan